Châtenois may refer to:

 Châtenois, Bas-Rhin, a commune of the French region of Alsace
 Châtenois, Haute-Saône, a commune of the French region of Franche-Comté
 Châtenois, Jura, a commune of the French region of Franche-Comté
 Châtenois, Vosges, a commune of the French region of Lorraine
 Châtenois-les-Forges, a commune of France in the Territoire de Belfort department
 Courcelles-sous-Châtenois, a commune of France in the Vosges department
 La Neuveville-sous-Châtenois, a commune of France in the Vosges department
 Longchamp-sous-Châtenois, a commune of France in the Vosges department

See also 
 Châtenoy (disambiguation)